Arne Skouen (18 October 1913 – 24 May 2003) was a Norwegian journalist, author, film director and film producer.

Biography
Arne Skouen was born in Kristiania (now Oslo), Norway. His parents were Peder Nikolai Skouen (1883-1978) and Jenny Emanuelson (1883-1975). He graduated at Hegdehaugen School in 1933. He had three distinct career careers: journalist, author and filmmaker, partly at the same time.

He was a journalist at Dagbladet from 1935 to 1941. From 1941 during World War II, Skouen was associated with the Norwegian Resistance Movement during the occupation of Norway by Nazi Germany. From 1943 to 1945, Skouen worked at the press office in Stockholm, London, and New York City.

After the liberation of Norway at the end of World War II, he returned to Dagbladet as a columnist, serving from  1946 to 1947. He then worked at Verdens Gang from 1947 to 1957. He later returned to Dagbladet, where he worked from 1971 to 1995.

Literary career
Skouen debuted as an author with the youth novel Gymnasiast (1932), followed by the novel Ruth sett meg (1937). During the war he published the children's play Barn av solen (1941) and Tre små enaktere  (1943). This was followed in the postwar years by his novels Fest i Port des Galets and Romanen Gategutter (1948). Late in life, he published his autobiography En journalists erindringer (1996).

Film career
After the war, Skouen began working in film. His first film Gategutter (Street Boys) was released in 1949.

He received international fame for his 1957 film Ni Liv, about Jan Baalsrud's survival following a failed a WWII commando raid in occupied Norway, which received an Academy Award nomination for Best Foreign Language Film. It was also shown at the Cannes Film Festival.

His 1959 film The Master and His Servants was entered into the 9th Berlin International Film Festival. His 1962 film Cold Tracks was entered into the 3rd Moscow International Film Festival.

In 1980, he received the Narvesen Prize (Narvesenprisen), in 1983 the Oslo City Culture Prize, in 1986 the Ibsen Prize (Ibsenprisen) and the Honorary Prize of the Amanda Prize (Amandaprisen), in 1988 the Arts Council Norway Honorary Award (Norsk kulturråds ærespris), in 1993 the Oslo Byes Veles Prize  and Fritt Ord Award. He was an honorary member of the Norwegian Dramatic Society and Norwegian Film Association.

Personal life
He was married in 1946 to Kari Øksnevad (born 1926). Their daughter Synne Skouen (born 1950) became a composer.

On May 24, 2003, he died, and was buried at Vestre gravlund in Oslo.

Selected filmography
 Emergency Landing (1952)
 Circus Fandango (1954)
 Det brenner i natt! (1955)
 Ni Liv (1957)
 Pastor Jarman kommer hjem (1958)
 The Master and His Servants (1959)
 Omringet (1960)
 Cold Tracks (1962)
 Om Tilla (1963)
 Reisen til havet (1966)
 An-Magritt (1969)

References

Sources
 Linn Ullmann (2001) Profession, director : Arne Skouen and his films (translation  by Tiina Nunnally. Norwegian Film Institute)

External links

1913 births
2003 deaths
Journalists from Oslo
Norwegian film producers
Norwegian film directors
Norwegian male writers
Norwegian dramatists and playwrights
Dagbladet people
Norwegian columnists
Burials at Vestre gravlund
20th-century Norwegian journalists
Film people from Oslo